The Greatest Hits World Tour is the seventh concert world tour by Italian singer Laura Pausini, in promotion of her new compilation album 20 – The Greatest Hits that was released on 12 November 2013. The tour began with a show in Pesaro on 5 December 2013 and ended in 2015. In Spanish-speaking countries, the tour was renamed "Grandes Exitos Gira Mundial".

In February 2014, Pausini confirmed on her official site that the tour would be prolonged and that more shows would happen after the 20 originally planned. This new set of concerts includes two performances in Australia and one performance in Russia, marking the first time Pausini performs in such countries.

On 10 June 2014, Pausini postponed her two Australian shows 'due to unforeseen technical problems and production issues'. The Melbourne concert scheduled for 12 June 2014 at Rod Laver Arena would now take place on 13 February 2015 at a smaller venue, Margaret Court Arena. The 14 June, Sydney show was announced for 14 February 2015.

Background 
On 26 February 2013, in order to celebrate the twentieth anniversary of her career, Pausini released a digital single including the original versions in Italian, Spanish and English of the song which launched her career in 1993, "La solitudine". The track was launched as a limited-edition single, available for purchase for a week only. Later during the same year, she confirmed that a greatest hits album would be released for the same purpose by December 2013.

On 1 June 2013 Pausini took part in the concert Chime for Change in London, supporting the global campaign of the same name for girls' and women's empowerment. Pausini performed the songs "Io canto" and "It's Not Goodbye".
During the same year, she appeared as a featured artist on the track "Sonríe (Smile)", included in American singer Gloria Estefan's album The Standards.
A new world tour was also confirmed by Pausini through her official website. Starting from December 2013, Pausini would promote her greatest hits album with concerts in her native Italy, as well as in other European countries, in Latin America, in the United States and in Canada. The tour also includes a performance during the Viña del Mar International Song Festival in Chile.

On 9 September 2013, Pausini released a new single named "Limpido" (in Spanish, "Limpio"), in order to promote her new album. The song is a duet between Pausini and the Australian singer Kylie Minogue. On the same day, the name of the album was confirmed to be 20 – The Greatest Hits / 20 – Grandes Exitos.

Special guests 
Many of the world tour's concerts featured other singers as special guests, personally invited by Pausini.

On 22 December 2013, Italian singers Emma Marrone and Biagio Antonacci shared with Pausini the vocals in the songs "Come se non fosse stato mai amore" and "Vivimi", respectively.

It was confirmed by Laura Pausini that three other concerts would have special guests. The first one was the one in Mexico City on 28 February 2014, where Pausini was joined by fellow singers Ximena Sariñana and Aleks Syntek. The second one was the one in Miami, on 2 March 2014 where Luis Fonsi, and Biagio Antonacci, joined Laura in the songs "Como si no nos hubiéramos amado" and "Víveme/Vivimi". The third show was in New York City where she sang with the group Il Volo and the singers Biagio Antonacci, Miguel Bosé, Ivete Sangalo and Gloria Estefan.

For the concerts held in Mexico, in the month of November 2014, Pausini invited the participants of La Voz (Mexican TV series), to sing with her on stage. Mexican singer Yuri was invited to the last concert in Mexico held in the country's capital.

Setlist 

Summer tour

{{hidden
| headercss = background: #ccccff; font-size: 100%; width: 90%;
| contentcss = text-align: left; font-size: 100%; width: 90%;
| header = Spain – Festival  Valladolid Latino
| content = 
 Limpio
 Sino a ti
 Entre tú y mil mares
 Jamàs abandonè
 Bienvenido
 Primavera anticipada (It Is My Song)
 Con la musica en la radio''
 Volveré junto a tí Escucha atento Emergencia de amor Como si no nos hubiéramos amado En cambio no Yo canto Inolvidable Víveme En ausencia de ti Gente Amores extraños Las cosas que vives Se fué La soledad}}

 Additional notes 
On 22 December 2013, Come se non fosse stato mai amore was performed with Emma Marrone and Vivimi with Biagio Antonacci.
On 1 February 2014, On n'oublie jamais rien, on vit avec was performed instead of Come se non fosse stato mai amore and Je chante (Io canto) was performed in a French-Italian version.
On 2 February 2014 On n'oublie jamais rien, on vit avec was performed instead of Come se non fosse stato mai amore and Je chante (Io canto) was performed in a French-Italian version.
In all the shows in Brazil, the songs Invece no, Incancellabile and Le cose che vivi were performed in an Italian-Portuguese version. Moreover, the song Se fue was performed instead of Non c'è.
On 20 February 2014, Io canto was performed in its Italian/French version instead of the solo Italian one. Also, due to technical problems, Dove resto solo io was not performed.
In the end of her performance at the Viña del Mar International Song Festival, Pausini performed a fragment of the song Gracias a la Vida. This concert also was the first time Pausini performed the song "Quiero decirte que te amo" completely since the song was released in 2000.
On 28 February 2014, Pausini performed the popular Mexican song Cielito Lindo before La soledad. Moreover, Pausini performed the songs Primavera Anticipada (It is my song), Volveré junto a ti and Entre tú y mil mares with Ximena Sariñana, Mario Sandoval and Aleks Syntek, respectively.
On 2 March 2014, Pausini performed the song Vivimi with Biaggio Antonacci after Yo canto and the song Como si no nos hubieramos amado with Luis Fonsi after It's not goodbye.
On 6 March 2014, Pausini performed the song Vivimi with Biaggio Antonacci, In assenza di te with the group Il Volo, Le cose che vivi/Tudo o que eu vivo with Ivete Sangalo, Smile with Gloria Estefan and Te amaré with Miguel Bosé.
The song Mi rubi l'anima was performed for the first time ever with Raf on 18 May 2014, 20 years after Pausini shared the vocals with Raf in the same song, present in her debut album.
After the first European and American legs of the tour, the songs Le cose che vivi and Las cosas que vives were no longer performed in the Portuguese/Italian and Portuguese/Spanish versions.

 Band 
Band
Nicola Peruch: Pianoforte
Simone Bertolotti: keyboard
Paolo Carta: electric guitar, musical direction
Nicola Oliva: electric guitar
Roberto Gallinelli: Bass guitar
Carlos Hercules: drum kit
Roberta Granà: backing vocal
Monica Hill: backing vocal
Gianluigi Fazio: backing vocal
Salimata Ariane Diakite: backing vocalB.I.M. Orchestra: Strings

Strings B.I.M. Orchestra''
Violin: Marcello Sirignano, Luisiana Lorusso, Elena Floris, Giovanni De Rossi, Chiara Antonutti, Prisca Amori, Mario Gentili, Alessandra Xanto, Soichi Ichicawa.
Viola: Adriane Ester Gallo, Claudia Mizzoni, Adriana Marinucci
Cello: Giuseppe Tortora, Claudia Della Gatta

Choreography
Cristian Ciccone: dancer

Tour dates 

Festivals and other miscellaneous performances
Viña del Mar International Song Festival
Valladolid Latino
Moon and Stars
Feria del Hogar: El Gran EStelar
Monte-Carlo Sporting Summer Festival
Starlite Festival

Box office

References

External links 
 Laura Pausini – Official website

2013 concert tours
2014 concert tours
2015 concert tours
Laura Pausini concert tours